Grzegorz Józef Stellak (born 11 March 1951) is a Polish rower who competed in the 1972 Summer Olympics, in the 1976 Summer Olympics, and in the 1980 Summer Olympics.

He was born in Płock.

In 1972 he was a crew member of the Polish boat which finished sixth in the eight event.

Four years later he finished sixth with the Polish boat in the 1976 coxed pair competition.

At the 1980 Games he was part of the Polish boat which won the bronze medal in the coxed fours contest. In the same Olympics he also competed with the Polish team in the 1980 eight event and finished ninth.

External links
 

1951 births
Living people
Polish male rowers
Olympic rowers of Poland
Rowers at the 1972 Summer Olympics
Rowers at the 1976 Summer Olympics
Rowers at the 1980 Summer Olympics
Olympic bronze medalists for Poland
Olympic medalists in rowing
Sportspeople from Płock
Medalists at the 1980 Summer Olympics
World Rowing Championships medalists for Poland